Jérémy Bellicaud (born 6 June 1998) is a French cyclist, who currently rides for French amateur team Océane Top 16.

Major results
2019
 3rd Overall Tour de Savoie Mont Blanc
1st  Young rider classification
2021
 9th Trofeo Andratx – Mirador d’Es Colomer

References

External links

1998 births
Living people
French male cyclists
Sportspeople from Charente-Maritime
Cyclists from Nouvelle-Aquitaine